During the 2000–01 English football season, Barnsley F.C. competed in the Football League First Division.

Season summary
With Craig Hignett and Nicky Eaden departing, manager Dave Bassett brought in inexperienced Carl Regan and Lee Jones to bolster the squad in the hopes that Barnsley would finally return to the Premiership. However, Barnsley's increasingly rapid turnover of managers was to continue during the season with Bassett leaving in December, a surprise decision to most. Nigel Spackman was brought in to replace Bassett, and the team eventually finished in sixteenth position, above Sheffield Wednesday by virtue of goal difference.

Final league table

Results
Barnsley's score comes first

Legend

Football League First Division

FA Cup

League Cup

Squad
Squad at end of season

Left club during season

References

Barnsley F.C. seasons
Barnsley